Murghob or Murghab (from the Persian word margh-ab, meaning 'prairie river') is the capital of Murghob District in the Pamir Mountains of Gorno-Badakhshan, Tajikistan. With a population of just under 7,500, Murghob is the only significant town in the eastern half of Gorno-Badakhshan. It is the highest town in Tajikistan (and of the former Soviet Union) at 3,650 meters above sea level. It is where the Pamir Highway crosses the Bartang river. 

The Pamir Highway goes north to Sary-Tash and on to Osh in Kyrgyzstan and southwest to the region's capital Khorugh. Another road goes east over the Kulma Pass to the Karakoram Highway in China connecting to Tashkurgan to the south and Kashgar to the north.

History 

From 1892 to 1893, a fortification named Shadzhansky Post existed on the site of the current town of Murghob. Some historical records attest that, in 1893, Russian soldiers established Pamirsky Post in the area as the main Russian fortification in the Pamir Mountains. It was to be their most advanced military outpost into Central Asia. Other records published much later state that Pamirsky Post was actually established elsewhere on 26 July 1903, as new barracks near the village of Kuni Kurgan.

The modern town of Murghob was constructed during the period of Soviet rule in Tajikistan as a rest stop along the Pamir Highway. The old Soviet military outpost closed in 2002, causing economic hardship partially offset by a rise in tourism.

Climate 
Murghob has an alpine tundra climate (ET) in the Köppen climate classification.

References

Citations

Sources 

 "Gorno-Badakhshan, Tajikistan: Trekking Routes" (map). www.pamirs.org.  Retrieved 25 August 2005.
 Jennings, David. (18 – 25 July 2004) "Sixty One Degrees: An Occasional Journal of an Asia-overland adventure".

Populated places in Gorno-Badakhshan